Christian Jacob is a French jazz pianist. He has gained widespread exposure as co-leader, arranger and pianist with vocalist Tierney Sutton, although he has also maintained a substantial career as a solo artist and leader.

Early years
Jacob was born in Metz, Lorraine on 8 May 1958. A pianist by age four, he was immersed in studying the French classics. Something of a child prodigy, Jacob had perfect pitch and natural talent. He did not discover jazz until age 10, but when he did, its improvised nature appealed to him immediately. Early influences were Dave Brubeck and Oscar Peterson. As a teen, Jacob studied under Pierre Sancan at the Conservatoire National Superieur de Musique in Paris. Later, he would teach piano at the Conservatoire National de Region in Metz.

In January 1983, Jacob entered Berklee College of Music in Boston, Massachusetts, and won many awards as a student, including the Joe Zawinul Jazz Masters Award, Oscar Peterson Jazz Masters Award, and Down Beat "Top Collegiate Jazz Soloist" before graduating magna cum laude in 1985. Jacob then took a teaching position at Berklee.

During his years in Boston, he formed "Bostonian Friends", a musical partnership with Swiss saxophonist Fritz Renold, which produced jazz recordings ("Starlight" 1996) and classical commissions ("The 6 Cycles" with the Thai Symphony Orchestra 1999, and "Helvetic Suite" 1998). Although having renounced the classical performing circuit for jazz, Jacob has maintained ties with the classical world through projects such as these commissioned works. Renold introduced Jacob to the Swiss Youth Jazz Orchestra, for which he was an arranger and educator throughout the 1990s. From 1992 to 1994, Jacob also served as Director in Residence of the "Orchestre Regional Jazz de Lorraine" in Nancy, Meurthe-et-Moselle, and composed their inaugural commission.

Career

Professional years
While still at Berklee, Jacob worked with vibraphonist Gary Burton, but left Boston to tour with Maynard Ferguson through 1992. Jacob served as performer, writer, and arranger with Ferguson's band. This led to Ferguson producing Jacob's first piano trio record, featuring John Patitucci and Peter Erskine. Sidemen for his follow-up trio project "Time Lines" were Steve Swallow and Adam Nussbaum. Jacob developed material with a third trio featuring Miroslav Vitouš and Bill Stewart. The first two recordings were released on Concord Records, but the later is yet to be released.

Jacob has extensive credits as a sideman, including Phil Woods, Michael Brecker, Randy Brecker, Flora Purim, Airto Moreira, Terje Gewelt, Carl Saunders and others, but his most visible association has been as co-leader and pianist for Telarc recording artist Tierney Sutton.

The Tierney Sutton Band
Initially Jacob was hired to perform on one recording with Tierney, but the group bonded musically and gave up their leader/sidemen statuses. Sutton, Trey Henry, Ray Brinker, Kevin Axt and Jacob became co-leaders of The Tierney Sutton Band. As co-leaders, they recorded eight CDs. Unsung Heroes, Blue in Green, Something Cool, Dancing in the Dark, I'm with the Band, On the Other Side, Desire and American Road. The latter four were each nominated for a Grammy Award. In 2012 Christian and The Tierney Sutton Band received two Grammy nominations for American Road, Best Jazz Vocal Album and Best Arrangement Accompanying a Vocalist.

The Christian Jacob Trio
Jacob released three trio recordings on his own independent label WilderJazz.  The 2004 release, Styne & Mine, is a tribute to the music of Jule Styne, and reached No. 3 in the jazz radio charts. The trio then recorded Contradictions in 2006. The recording pays homage and offers another look at the original compositions of pianist Michel Petrucciani. Jacob's next trio  recording was a joint venture with Japanese label SSJ, titled Live in Japan. It was recorded live at Tokyo Tuc Jazz Club in 2008.

Musical director for Betty Buckley
In 2011 Jacob became music director for the Broadway singer Betty Buckley. His introduction to her world of Broadway was a week of sold out performances at Feinstein's nightclub in New York. Musically it was a perfect fit. He was happy to reunite with an aspect of classical music. At the end of 2011 they brought the show into the recording studio. Ah, Men! The Boys of Broadway  will be released in August 2012 by Palmetto Records.
 
His arranging credits include writing for Randy Brecker, Franco Ambrosetti, Benny Golson, Gary Burton, Tommy Smith and The Scottish National Jazz Orchestra, Jazzaar (The Swiss Youth Jazz Orchestra) and his own big band "Big Band Theory".

Awards
 Down Beat Magazine Top Collegiate Jazz Soloist 1986
 3-time Grammy nominee for Best Vocal Jazz Album
 Grammy nominee 2011 Best Arrangement Accompanying Vocalist
 Oscar Peterson Jazz Masters Award
 Winner of the 6th annual Great American Jazz Piano Competition at the Jacksonville Jazz Festival

Discography

As leader/co-leader

As sideman
 2015: Brian Eisenberg ~ "Sense of Gratitude" — Pianist
 2014: Carl Saunders ~ "America" — Pianist
 2014: Freda Payne ~ "Come Back to Me Love" — Pianist
 2014: The Gary Urwin Jazz Orchestra ~ "A Beautiful Friendship" — Pianist
 2014: The Swiss Youth Jazz Orchestra ~ "Future Steps" — Pianist, Arranger
 2014: Sam Most ~ "New Jazz Standards" — Pianist
 2013: Kuni Murai ~ "Arsene Lupin" — Pianist, Arranger
 2012: Betty Buckley ~ "Ah Men! The Boys of Broadway"— Pianist, Arranger
 2012: Scottish National Jazz Orchestra ~ "Celebration" — Arranger
 2011: Phil Norman ~ "Encore" - Pianist, Arranger
 2008: Vic Lewis ` "Celebration of Contemporary West Coast Jazz" — Pianist, Arranger
 2007: Wayne Bergeron ~ "Plays Well With Others"—Pianist
 2007: Maynard Ferguson ~ "One and Only" — Pianist, Composer, Arranger, Group Member
 2007: The Carl Saunders Exploration ~ "The Lost Bill Holman Charts"—Pianist
 2006: The Bill Holman Band ~ "Hommage"—Pianist
 2005: The Bill Holman Band ~ "Live"—Pianist
 2005: Flora Purim ~ "Flora's Song"—Pianist, Arranger
 2005: Carl Saunders ~ "Can You Dig Being Dug"—Pianist
 2005: Gene Burkert ~ "The Jazz Palette"—Pianist, Keyboard
 2005: Phil Woods "Groovin' to Marty Paich"—Pianist, Music Director
 2005: Terje Gewelt & Christian Jacob ~ "Hope"—Pianist, Composer, Arranger
 2003: Flora Purim ~ "Speak No Evil"—Pianist
 2003: Gary Meek ~ "Step 7"—Pianist
 2002: Carl Saunders	 ~ "Be Bop Big Band" - Pianist
 2002: Alan Kaplan ~ "Lonely Town"—Pianist
 2001: West Coast All-Stars ~ "With Love To Gerry"—Pianist
 2001: Flora Purim ~ "Perpetual Emotion"—Pianist, Arranger
 1998: Vic Lewis ~ "West Coast All Stars"—Pianist
 1998: Miki Coltrane ~ "I Think of You"—Pianist
 1997: The Tierney Sutton Band ~ "Introducing Tierney Sutton"—Pianist, Arranger
 1997: Tom Garling ~ "Maynard Ferguson Presents Tom Garling"—Pianist, Arranger
 1997: Fritz Renold ~ "StarLight"—Pianist, Composer, Arranger
 1997: Gene Burkert ~ "The System"—Pianist
 1995: "Vic Lewis Presents West Coast Jazz"—Pianist
 1994: Maynard Ferguson ~ "Live From London"—Pianist, Keyboards, Arranger
 1993: Anita O'Day (with The Jack Sheldon Orchestra) ~ "Rules Of The Road"—Pianist
 1993: Fritz Renold Quartet Plus 2 ~ "Shanti & Sri"—Pianist, Composer, Arranger
 1992: Maynard Ferguson ~ "Footpath Cafe"—Composer, Arranger
 1990: Christian Ledelezir (with Dave Liebman) ~ "Exaton"—Pianist
 1988: Fabio Morgera/George Garzone	 ~ "Take One"—Pianist
 1988: Vaughn Hawthorne ~ "The Path"—Pianist

References

External links
Official website

1958 births
French jazz pianists
French male pianists
Living people
People from Lorraine
21st-century pianists
21st-century French male musicians
French male jazz musicians
Eurovision Song Contest conductors